The 2016 World University Cycling Championship was the 7th edition of the World University Cycling Championship. The tournament was hosted by the Federation of School Sports Association of the Philippines (FESSAP), sponsored by the International University Sports Federation (FISU) and sanctioned by the Union Cycliste Internationale (UCI). The championship proper took place in Tagaytay, Philippines from March 17–20, 2016 with the opening ceremonies held on March 16. It is the first FISU World University Cycling Championship to be held outside of Europe and the first in Asia.

Race details
Four races was conducted in the Tagaytay–Batangas City route: Road Race spaning 122-km, Criterium spanning 80-km, Cross-country cycling spanning 35-km and, Cross Country Eliminator spanning 1.2 km.

Participants
120 cyclists from 16 nations entered the tournament.

Schedule
 Thursday, March 17, 2016
 Criterium: women's race, 36 km (1.8 km track, 20 laps)
 Criterium: men's race, 54 km (1.8 km track, 30 laps)
 Friday, March 18, 2016
 Road cycling: women's road race
 Road cycling: men's road race
 Saturday, March 19, 2016
 Cross Country Eliminator: women's race
 Cross Country Eliminator: men's race
 Sunday March 20, 2016
 Cross Country Olympic: women's race
 Cross Country Olympic: men's race

Events summary

Road cycling

Mountain biking

Medal table

References

External links
Official Website

World University Cycling Championships
Cycling
Sports in Cavite
World University Cycling Championships
International cycle races hosted by the Philippines
World University
March 2016 sports events in the Philippines